Reuben "Ben" Marden (2 February 1927 – 2000) was an English footballer who played in the Football League for Arsenal and Watford.

External links
 Ben Marden stats at Neil Brown stat site

English footballers
English Football League players
1927 births
2000 deaths
Chelmsford City F.C. players
Arsenal F.C. players
Watford F.C. players
Bedford Town F.C. players
Association football forwards